Los Lagos is a department located in the south of Neuquén Province, Argentina.

Geography
The Department limits with Lácar Department at north, Rio Negro Province at the east and southeast, with Chile at southwest and east.

Departments of Neuquén Province